Ghulam Mohammed Sheikh (born 16 February 1937) is a painter, poet and art critic from Gujarat, India. He was awarded the Padma Shri in 1983 and Padmabhushan in 2014 for his contribution in field of art.

Early life
Sheikh was born on 16 February 1937 in Surendranagar (now in Saurashtra region of Gujarat, India). He matriculated in 1955. He completed B. A. in Fine Art in 1959 and M. A. in 1961 from Faculty of Fine Arts, Maharaja Sayajirao University of Baroda. He received ARCA from Royal College of Art, London in 1966.

Career
In 1960, he joined as a professor of Fine Arts in the Faculty of Fine Arts, M.S. University, Baroda. His teaching positions have included teaching art history in the Faculty of Fine Arts, Baroda (1960–63 and 1967–81,) and as Professor of Painting, Faculty of Fine Arts, Baroda (1982–1993). He has been a Visiting Artist at the Art Institute of Chicago in 1987 and 2002, and a Writer/Artist in Residence at Civitella Ranieri Center, Umbertide, Italy (1998), at the University of Pennsylvania (2002), and at Montalvo, California (2005).

Sheikh has been a major figure in the world of Indian art for more than four decades. He has participated in major exhibitions all over the world and his works are displayed in private and public collections including the National Gallery of Modern Art in New Delhi, Victoria and Albert Museum in London and the Peabody Essex Museum in Salem, USA. Ghulam has been active not merely as an artist but also as a teacher and writer.

His collection of Gujarati surrealistic poems, Athwa (1974) won him considerable critical acclaim. He has also written a prose series, Gher Jatan and edited special issues of Kshitij as well as Vishwamanav and Sayujya magazines. American Chitrakala (1964) is his translated work.

Style
"Sheikh's art is by its nature," writes Chaitanya Sambrani, "one that takes on task of narrating, and therefore, recreating the world. There is a close tie-in between this narrative and an act of mapping the world, which gives to the speaking subject the possibility of addressing the world as his/her own". Recently Sheikh had been working on the Mappa Mundi series where he defines new horizons and ponders over to locate himself in. Sheikh construes these personal universes enthused from the miniature shrines where he urges the audience to exercise the freedom to build up their Mappa Mundi.

Personal life
Ghulam Mohammed Sheikh lives with his artist-wife Nilima in Vadodara, India.

Awards
 National Award, Lalit Kala Akademi, New Delhi, 1962.
 Padmashri by Government of India, 1983
 Kalidas Samman, Madhya Pradesh Government, 2002.
 Padma Bhushan by Government of India, 2014
 Sahitya Akademi Award for Gujarati, 2022

Guest Lectures

 "Among Many Cultures and Times", Georgetown University, Washington D.C., 21 March 2013.

Exhibitions

 Solo Exhibition at Jehangir Art Gallery, Bombay, 1960
 National Exhibition, New Delhi, 1962
 The VII Tokyo Biennale, Tokyo, Japan, 1963
 Cinquieme Biennale de Paris, Paris, 1967
 25 Years of Indian Art, Lalit Kala Akademi, Rabindra Bhavan, New Delhi, 1972
 Contemporary painting of India, Belgrade, Warsaw, Sofia, Brussels, 1974
 III Triennale (India), Rabindra Bhavan, New Delhi, 1975
 Place for People (6 artists), Jehangir Art Gallery, Bombay and Rabindra Bhavan, New Delhi, 1981
 Contemporary Indian Art, Royal Academy of Arts, Festival of India, London, 1982
 Returning Home, Solo Exhibition (a retrospective selection of work from 1968 to 1985) at Centre Georges Pompidou, Musee National d'Art Modeme, Paris, 1985
 Timeless Art, exhibition and auction, Times of India sesquicentennial at Victoria Terminus, Bombay, 1989
 Realism as an Attitude, IV Asian Art Show, Fukuoka, Japan, 1995
 Two-person show (with Bhupen Khakhar), Walsh Gallery, Chicago, USA, 2002

Publications
2017, 'Nirkhe te Nazar', a collection of writings on visual arts in Gujarati, Samvad Prakashan, Vadodara & Khsitij Sansodhan Prakashan Kendra, Mumbai.
 Athwa (poems in Gujarati), Butala, Vadodara 1974.
 Laxma Goud, monograph on the artist, Hyderabad, A. P. Lalit Kala Akademi, Hyderabad 1981.
 Contemporary Art of Baroda (ed.), Tulika, New Delhi 1996.
 Essays, articles and papers in 'Marg', 'Journal of Arts & Ideas', 'Lalit Kala Contemporary' as well as Hindi and Gujarati journals.
 Exhibition catalogues of K G Subramanyan, Jeram Patel, Laxma Goud, DLN Reddy, D Devraj, etc.

Bibliography

 Geeta Kapur, Contemporary Indian Art, Royal Academy, London,1982
 Ajay Sinha, Revolving Routes, Form, Dhaka, Bangladesh, 1983
 From Art to Life (interview with Gieve Patel for exhibition catalogue), Returning Home, Centre Georges Pompidou, Paris 1985
 Timothy Hyman, Sheikh's One Painting, Returning Home (exhibition catalogue), Centre Georges Pompidou, Paris 1985
  New Figuration in India, Art International, Spring 1990
 Geeta Kapur Riddles of the Sphinx, in Journeys (exhibition catalogue), CMC Gallery, New Delhi, 1991
 Kamala Kapoor, New Thresholds of Meaning, Art India, Quarter 3, 2001
 Palimpsest, interview with Kavita Singh, (exhibition catalogue), Vadehra Art Gallery, New Delhi, Sakshi Gallery, Mumbai, 2001
 Kamala Kapoor in Valerie Breuvart (ed.) VITAMIN P : New Perspectives in Painting, Phaidon Press, London/ New York 2002
 Gayatri Sinha, The Art of Ghulam Mohammed Sheikh, Lustre Press / Roli Books, New Delhi, 2002
 Zecchini Laetitia, "More than one world: An interview with Ghulam Mohammed Sheikh", Journal of Postcolonial Writing, Vol. 53, 1-2, 2017

See also

References

External links 

 Profile on Google Arts & Culture
 Ghulam Mohammed Sheikh Archive on Asia Art Archive

1937 births
Indian Muslims
Indian male painters
Living people
Recipients of the Padma Shri in arts
People associated with Santiniketan
People from Vadodara
Recipients of the Padma Bhushan in arts
Maharaja Sayajirao University of Baroda alumni
20th-century Indian painters
Gujarati-language poets
Painters from Gujarat
20th-century Indian male artists
Recipients of the Sahitya Akademi Award in Gujarati